Scrub bulbul may refer to the following species of birds:

 Grey-cheeked bulbul, found in south-eastern Asia 
 Terrestrial brownbul, found in eastern and south-eastern Africa 

Birds by common name